KF Shënkolli is an Albanian football club based in Shënkoll in the Lezhë District. The club currently competes in the Kategoria e Dytë.

History
The club was founded on 5 July 2011.

After competing for 4 years in Albanian lowest football category, FK Shënkolli was promoted for the first time to the Albanian First Division.

Current squad

References

Football clubs in Albania
Lezhë
2011 establishments in Albania
Association football clubs established in 2011
Kategoria e Dytë clubs